Samuel Fastle (born June 1, 1995 in Albuquerque, New Mexico) is an American National motorcycle trials rider.

Biography
After several years of riding with the New Mexico Trials Association, working his way up through the classes, Fastle clinched his first US title in 2012 when he became the NATC Expert 125cc Champion after winning six of the eight rounds.

In 2013 he moved up to the NATC Expert class having an excellent season starting out with a 3rd place at the opening New York round behind Ray Peters and Daniel Blanc-Gonnet. Fastle followed this up with a 2nd place behind Peters in Vermont, and a pair of 3rds in Arizona behind Peters and fellow New Mexico rider Nathan Hassler. His final ride of the season in Expert was on home soil in New Mexico, Fastle put in a strong ride again finishing runner-up to reigning champion Peters. He ended the year 3rd in the Championship behind Peters and Blanc-Gonnet. One of Fastle's highlights of the season was winning the annual Ute Cup, held in Colorado by the Rocky Mountain Trials Association (RMTA).

For the final three rounds of the season Fastle moved to the NATC Pro class, finishing 5th in New Mexico, 6th and 5th in Minnesota.

Being a Mormon, Fastle then took two years out, away on a mission for the Church of Jesus Christ of Latter-day Saints.

Returning to the sport in 2016, Fastle picked up where he had left off and finished 8th in the NATC Pro series, with his best rides a pair of 6th places coming in Tennessee and Oregon. He was also named as the alternative rider in the US Men's Trial des Nations team to compete in France.

In 2017, again in NATC Pro Fastle took a step up to 7th place at the end of the season, having consistent 7th and 8th-place finishes all season, and once again being named as the alternative US Trial des Nations rider for the team this year competing in Spain.

National Trials Championship Career

Honors
NATC Expert 125cc Champion 2012

References 

1994 births
Living people
American motorcycle racers
Motorcycle trials riders